Bolshoye Kosikovo is a rural locality (a village) in Rostilovskoye Rural Settlement, Gryazovetsky District, Vologda Oblast, Russia. The population was 63 as of 2002.

Geography 
Bolshoye Kosikovo is located 13 km south of Gryazovets (the district's administrative centre) by road. Studenets is the nearest rural locality.

References 

Rural localities in Gryazovetsky District